No Retreat, No Surrender is a 1985 martial arts film directed by Corey Yuen in his American film directorial debut. The film stars Kurt McKinney, with a supporting cast of Jean-Claude Van Damme, J.W. Fails, Kathie Sileno and Tai-chung Kim. The film was released in Italy on October 20, 1985, and the United States on May 2, 1986. McKinney performs as Jason Stillwell, an American teenager who learns martial arts from the spirit of Bruce Lee. Stillwell uses these lessons to defend his martial arts dojo against Soviet martial artist Ivan Kraschinsky (Van Damme). It is the first film in the No Retreat, No Surrender franchise.

The film was written by Keith W. Strandberg after being contracted by Ng See-yuen, the owner of Seasonal Film Corporation, to write a script for them, despite having never written a script beforehand. Van Damme was cast in the film and caused problems on the set for continually physically contacting other actors and stuntmen during the fight scenes even after director Yuen told him not to. Upon release, the film received negative reviews, focusing on the story which many critics found too similar to the film The Karate Kid.

Plot
Jason Stillwell is a young karate student and Bruce Lee fanatic who trains in his father Tom's dojo in Sherman Oaks, California. One night after a training session, the dojo is visited by members of an organized crime syndicate looking to take over all the dojos in the country. After refusing to join the organization, Tom's leg is broken by a Soviet martial artist named Ivan "The Russian" Krachinsky, one of the boss' hired thugs. A furious Jason tries to take revenge but is easily subdued by the Soviet. Tom discourages any further effort, telling his son that fighting is not the answer.

The Stillwell family relocates to Seattle, where Jason meets R.J. Madison and they become good friends. Jason reunites with his old girlfriend Kelly Riley, who lives in the neighborhood with her brother, Ian "Whirlwind" Riley, the newly crowned U.S. National Karate Champion. Despite this, Jason has a hard time adjusting, as he and R.J. are constantly beaten and harassed by the local bullies led by an obese boy named Scott and arrogant martial artist Dean "Shooting Star" Ramsay. After getting beaten up and humiliated by Scott and Dean at Kelly's birthday party, Jason visits the grave of Bruce Lee and asks him for help.

Later that night, Jason and Tom have a heated argument over Jason's involving himself in fights. When Jason calls his father a coward for running away from the syndicate, Tom destroys some of Jason's Bruce Lee memorabilia in the garage. Distraught, Jason consults with R.J., who helps him move all of his training gear into an abandoned house nearby. Exhausted from the move, Jason falls asleep at the house, but is suddenly awakened by the soul of Bruce Lee, who appears to Jason and begins to train him. Under Lee's tutelage, Jason goes from a below average fighter to a superior martial artist, at one point able to fend off several thugs who ambush his father in a parking lot. In doing so, Jason convinces him that there are times when fighting is necessary.

Later on, Jason, Tom, and R.J. attend an annual full-contact kickboxing tournament between the Seattle Sidekicks and the Manhattan Maulers martial arts teams. Before the contest can get under way, the crime syndicate interrupts and makes a wager that none of the Seattle fighters can defeat Ivan. While Dean and Frank are easily bested by the Soviet, Ivan's last opponent, Ian, makes an impressive showing, forcing Ivan to resort to dirty tactics to defeat him. With Ian helplessly entangled in the ring ropes, Scott attempts to bite Ivan in the leg, but the Soviet dispatches him with a headbutt. Kelly tries to stop Ivan by hitting him with a stool, but the Soviet easily disarms her and grabs her by the hair. Angered by this, Jason charges to the ring and attacks Ivan to the delight of the crowd. Utilizing his advanced training, Jason is finally able to conquer his nemesis and earns the respect of his peers and family, performing a flash kick when Ivan grabs and pins his leg. Thereafter, his friends and family celebrate with him as the frustrated crime syndicate leaves Seattle.

Cast

 Kurt McKinney as Jason Stillwell
 Jean-Claude Van Damme as Ivan "The Russian" Kraschinsky 
 J.W. Fails as R.J. Madison
 Kathie Sileno as Kelly Riley
 Tai-chung Kim as the ghost of Sensei Bruce Lee
 Kent Lipham as Scott
 Ron Pohnel as Ian "Whirlwind" Riley, the Seattle Sidekicks
 Dale Jacoby as Dean "Shooting Star" Ramsay, the Seattle Sidekicks
 Peter "Sugarfoot" Cunningham as Frank Peters, the Seattle Sidekicks
 Joe Verroca as New York mobster
 John Andes as New York mob boss
 Farid Panali as Fajad "the Headhunter" Azmand, the Manhattan Maulers
 Mark Zacharatos as Michael Rocco, the Manhattan Maulers
 Ty Martinez as John Alvarado, the Manhattan Maulers
 Timothy D. Baker as Tom Stillwell
 Gloria Marziano as Mrs. Stillwell
 Paul Oswell as Trevor

Production

Development and writing
After living in Taiwan for a year in the early 1980s, screenwriter Keith W. Strandberg became interested in working in martial arts films as an actor. Strandberg moved back to the United States and became a tour director in China, where he continued to stop by in Hong Kong to make contact with producers and screenwriters. After being turned down by several studios including Shaw Brothers, Strandberg read about Seasonal Film Corporation and got in contact with the studio head Ng See-yuen. Ng expressed an interest in making an American film and asked if Strandberg knew anything about screenplays. Strandberg stated that he had despite never seeing one before. A year later, Ng See-yuen contacted Strandberg in America stating that he wanted to write a script for them. Strandberg wrote a draft of what would become No Retreat, No Surrender. While production began on the film, Strandberg was on set and spent hours every night changing the script to improve its quality while filming.

Casting
Jean-Claude Van Damme was cast as the Soviet villain Ivan Kraschinsky. On set, Van Damme performed a round house kick on Pete Cunningham which rendered him unconscious. Actor and martial artist Timothy Baker stated that while working with Van Damme during the action scenes on the set, the production manager and director Corey Yuen instructed him to not make contact with the other actors and stuntmen. Despite continuous warnings, Van Damme continued to do so with his kicks to Baker during filming. Other actors and martial artists claimed that Van Damme had not been reckless with his physical contact, including Ron Pohnel, who said, "His control wasn't such as mine, but I had no complaints". Van Damme originally had a two picture deal with screenwriter Strandberg but broke his contract.

Release

Home media
While there was never a DVD release in the United States, a Blu-ray release was published by Kino Lorber Classics in the Region A on February 21, 2017, which contained both the American theatrical release and a longer international cut.

Reception and legacy

Box office
No Retreat, No Surrender was released on May 2, 1986. The film was the eleventh highest grossing film on its opening week in the American box office grossing $739,723. The film grossed a total of $4,662,137 in the United States and Canada.

The film sold  tickets in the United States, and 395,013 tickets in France.

Critical response
Walter Goodman of The New York Times gave the film a negative review, writing that the story appeared to have been "slapped-together". Time Out compared the film to The Last Dragon, Karate Kid, and Rocky IV noting that it "borrows heavily" from those films and "makes them look like masterpieces". The martial arts magazine Black Belt gave the film a rating of one and a half out of five noting that Jean-Claude Van Damme does not have much screen time and that the film was derivative of The Karate Kid.  Patrick Goldstein of the Los Angeles Times called it "hilariously bad" and an "amateurish clunker" with poor action scenes.

In 1993, Black Belt placed the film at seventh on their list of top ten choreographed martial arts films. The magazine specifically praised Van Damme's jump kicks while noting that McKinney's look "suspiciously quick" noting that "unlike the Hong Kong movie industry, American filmmakers have yet to master the technique of speeding up the film without "jumpy/fidgety" side effects". In 2017, Ed Travis of Cinapse said the film "manages to  entertain and delight with a combination of pure earnestness and legitimately cool fight work". Austin Trunick of Under the Radar said Van Damme's scenes "are prime Van Damme, at least, with some fantastic fight choreography and a full showcase of splits, high-kicks, and bug-eyed snarling".

The film was riffed live at a number of venues on the Mystery Science Theater 3000 Live: The Great Cheesy Movie Tour by Joel Hodgson in 2019.

It was also riffed by RiffTrax on October 15, 2015.

Sequels

See also
 American films of 1986
 List of action films of the 1980s

References

External links
 
 
 

1985 films
1985 martial arts films
1980s American films
1980s English-language films
1980s ghost films
American films about revenge
American ghost films
American martial arts films
Bruceploitation films
Chinese ghost films
Chinese martial arts films
Films about friendship
Films directed by Corey Yuen
Films set in Los Angeles
Films set in Nevada
Films set in Seattle
Films shot in California
Films shot in Washington (state)
Jeet Kune Do films
Karate films
Kickboxing films
Kung fu films
New World Pictures films
No Retreat, No Surrender films